Northpoint Bible College and Seminary is a private Pentecostal Bible college and seminary in Haverhill, Massachusetts. The college's sole purpose is to teach and train students for Pentecostal ministry for the spread of the Christian gospel. It offers undergraduate and graduate degrees in Biblical Studies and Practical Theology.

History
The School of the Prophets was founded as a volunteer-run institution in 1924 by Rev. Christine Gibson at East Providence, Rhode Island.  It was also at one time named Mount Zion Bible School. Later, as the Zion Bible Institute, it was closely associated with Zion Gospel Temple, originally a Holiness congregation founded in the late 19th century by Rev. Alphaeus Cleveland and subsequently pastored by Rev. Christine Gibson. The congregation later affiliated with the Pentecostal revival and continued as an independent Pentecostal church named Zion Gospel Temple. The nearby Zion Faith Home, Inc., a retirement home for missionaries, was also connected with the school and church for many years while the campus was located in East Providence, Rhode Island.

In 1985, Zion Bible Institute relocated to the former campus of Barrington College in Barrington, Rhode Island. At the time the institute was under the leadership of Dr. N. Benjamin Crandall, president from 1985 to 2000.  The centerpiece of the campus was the former Peck Mansion, a building listed on the registry of historic sites for the state of Rhode Island.   Renamed as the Gibson Memorial Building in honor of the institute's founder, it housed the President's Office, a variety of additional offices, and the library.

Following Crandall, Rev. George Cope served as president from 2000 to 2005.   The college became affiliated with the Assemblies of God USA in 2000. In 2001, it was accredited by the Association for Biblical Higher Education.

In 2007 Reverend Charles Crabtree, a former assistant superintendent of the Assemblies of God, accepted the position of president.
Also in 2007, David Green, CEO and founder of the Hobby Lobby chain of hobby stores, purchased the former Bradford College campus in Haverhill, Massachusetts. The  campus was given to Zion Bible College, and Zion was to fund the repairs and upgrades needed before commencing operations there. The college reopened on the new campus in the fall of 2008, and enrollment doubled from 200 to 400.

In 2012, the school's trustees changed the college's name to Northpoint Bible College, effective January 1, 2013.

In 2012, the Rev. Dr. J. David Arnett was elected to serve as the eighth president.  He led the college through many programmatic and campus upgrades.

In 2013, the Massachusetts Board of Higher Education approved the addition of Master's Degrees and Associate of Arts Degrees.

In 2017, the National Council for State Authorization Reciprocity Agreement approved Northpoint to offer postsecondary distance education courses and programs online.

A Hispanic Seminary (Northpoint Universidad Bíblica y Seminario) was added in the Fall of 2022.

Campus

The campus, formerly that of Bradford College, is located in the Bradford section of Haverhill at 320 South Main Street, Haverhill, MA 01835.

Academics
The college offers Associate in Arts, Bachelor of Arts, and Master of Arts degrees. All bachelor's degree students double major in Biblical Studies and a second major of their choice.

Affiliations
NPBC is accredited by the Association for Biblical Higher Education. It is approved the Massachusetts Department of Higher Education and Michigan Department of Higher Education. The institution is also endorsed by the Assemblies of God USA.

Student life
Chapel is held Monday through Thursday. Attendance is mandatory for all full-time students. On one Friday per month, there are class prayers.

There is a dress code for class attendance, chapel attendance, and leisure time.

In 2016, the college was granted an exemption from some of the provisions of Title IX that forbid discrimination on the basis of sex.

Residence life
Unmarried students without an established residence in the area are required to live on campus while attending Northpoint Bible College. There is one dormitory for men (Gallagher Hall) and one for women (Gibson Hall). Some married students live on the upper floors of Academy Hall.  Unmarried students who are not yet in their senior year are held to nightly campus curfew, room curfew, and weekly room inspections.

Distance education
Northpoint Bible College has satellite distance-education campuses in Grand Rapids, Michigan, Crestwood, Kentucky, Texarkana, Arkansas, and Los Angeles, California. Courses are also offered online.

Gallery

References

External links
Official website

Barrington, Rhode Island
Bible colleges
Educational institutions established in 1924
Education in Haverhill, Massachusetts
Assemblies of God seminaries and theological colleges
Universities and colleges in Essex County, Massachusetts
Seminaries and theological colleges in Massachusetts
1924 establishments in Massachusetts